The Tenth constituency for French residents overseas (dixième circonscription des Français établis hors de France) is one of eleven constituencies each electing one representative of French citizens overseas to the French National Assembly.

Area
It covers all French citizens living in the following forty-eight countries of Central, Eastern and Southern Africa, and of the Middle East: Angola, Bahrain, Benin, Botswana, Burundi, Chad, Cameroon, Central African Republic, Comoros, Democratic Republic of the Congo, Republic of the Congo, Djibouti, Egypt, Eritrea, Ethiopia, Equatorial Guinea, Gabon, Ghana, Iraq, Jordan, Kenya, Kuwait, Lebanon, Lesotho, Madagascar, Malawi, Mauritius, Mozambique, Namibia, Nigeria, Oman, Qatar, Rwanda, Sao Tome and Principe, Saudi Arabia, Seychelles, Somalia, South Africa, Sudan, Swaziland, Syria, Tanzania, Togo, United Arab Emirates, Uganda, Yemen, Zambia, and Zimbabwe. It does not include the overseas departments of Mayotte and Réunion, which are part of France and have their own constituencies.

As of New Year's Day 2011, the Tenth constituency contained 140,310 registered French voters - of which 19,725 in Lebanon and 19,930 in Madagascar, the two countries in the region with the greatest number of registered French residents.

This constituency elected its first ever representative at the 2012 French legislative election.

Deputies

Election results

2022

 
 
 
|-
| colspan="8" bgcolor="#E9E9E9"|
|-
 

 
 
 
 
 * Horizons dissident

2017

2012

Candidates
The list of candidates was officially finalised on 14 May. There were nineteen candidates:

The Socialist Party chose Jean-Daniel Chaoui, a resident of Antananarivo, as its candidate. His deputy (suppléante) was Rita Maalouf, a resident of Beirut.

The Union for a Popular Movement chose Alain Marsaud, a former judge. While he was established in France, his deputy (suppléante), Fabienne Blineau-Abiramia, was a resident of Beirut.

The Left Front chose Axelle Brémont-Bellini, a student of Egyptology and Anthropology in Cairo. She was a member of the French Communist Youth Movement, and fluent speaker of Arabic. Regarding the specifics of the constituency, she advocated the teaching of local languages in French expatriate schools, and "a transparent foreign policy respectful of the values of the Republic, with an end to Françafrique, and for a socially and environmentally sustainable development". Her deputy (suppléant) was Daniel Feurtet.

Europe Écologie–The Greens chose Lucien Bruneau, a resident of Addis-Abeba, with Agnès Joignerez as his deputy (suppléante).

The National Front chose Francis Maginot, a telecommunications engineer, with Jad Ghantous as his deputy.

The  centre-right Radical Party and the centrist Republican, Ecologist and Social Alliance jointly chose François Kahn as their candidate. He ran several companies which provide medical equipment for hospitals and clinics in Africa and the Middle East. His deputy was Ali Liaquat.

The centre-left Radical Party of the Left chose Saliha Ayadi, who had dual French and Algerian citizenship. Her deputy was Adrien Houabaloukou.

Solidarity and Progress, the French branch of the LaRouche movement, was represented by Pierre Bonnefoy, with Eric Mercier as his deputy.

Guy Makki, a member of the Union for a Popular Movement who did not obtain the endorsement of the party, stood as an independent. A resident of Dubai, he worked for BNP Paribas. His deputy was Marie Ferlay.

Patricia Elias Smida, a lawyer who lived and worked in both Lebanon and Gabon, stood as an independent candidate. She was a dissident member of the UMP. Her deputy was Xavier du Bourg de la Tour.

Marcel Misslin de Robillard, a resident of Mauritius, stood as an independent candidate. His deputy was Danielle Audineau-Herauld.

François Bridon, who was of French and Cameroonian descent and worked as a farmer in Cameroon, stood as an independent candidate. He had also lived in Gabon and Côte d'Ivoire. His deputy was Nina Tamic.

Jean-Pierre Pont, a journalist, was another independent candidate. His deputy was Mirna Khalifé.

The other independent candidates were: Bertrand Langlade (with Roger Teuron as deputy); Louis Perriere (with Jean-Marie Pierret); José Garson (with Bernard Boumba); Boudjema Naidji (with Malika Naidji); Adeline Kargue (with Andréas Loebell); and Habib Abi Yaghi Deguy (with Nadine Honeika).

Results
As in the other expatriate constituencies, turnout in the first round was low. Only in Botswana did over half (55.9%) of registered French citizens vote. Turnout was also comparatively high in Burundi (43.9%), Rwanda (42.7%) and Oman (42.1%). By contrast, turnout was a staggeringly low 0.6% in Syria, where only 9 people voted, out of the 1,542 French residents registered there in late 2010. Syria at the time of the election was undergoing violent internal conflict, and it is likely that many French residents had left the country. In Yemen, which had just experienced a revolution, turnout was also very low (9.1%), suggesting that some French residents had left the country prior to the election. Turnout was also notably low in the Comoros (6.7%), Egypt, where there had been a revolution in 2011 (18.3%), and South Africa (18.8%). In newly established South Sudan, where a polling station was set up in Juba, eight of the twenty-two registered French citizens voted (36.4%).

This is one of only three expatriate constituencies in which the main candidate of the right finished first in the first round. Independent  right-wing candidate Patricia Elias Smida also did well, obtaining more than 10% of the vote and finishing third.

Independent candidate Louis Perrière obtained just two votes - one cast in Benin, the other in South Africa.

References

10